Peter Malise Borwick (1913-1983) was an English cricketer active in 1932 who played for Northamptonshire (Northants). He was born in York on 21 November 1913 and died in Haselbeach, Northamptonshire on 23 December 1983. He appeared in three first-class matches as a righthanded batsman who bowled left-arm orthodox spin. He scored 25 runs with a highest score of 11 and took three wickets with a best performance of one for 25.

He also competed in two equestrian events at the 1948 Summer Olympics.

References

1913 births
1983 deaths
English cricketers
Northamptonshire cricketers
English male equestrians
Olympic equestrians of Great Britain
Equestrians at the 1948 Summer Olympics